Wayne County is a county located in the Ozark foothills in the U.S. state of Missouri. As of the 2020 census, the population was 10,974. The county seat is Greenville. The county was officially organized on December 11, 1818, and is named after General "Mad" Anthony Wayne, who served in the American Revolution.

History
Wayne County was created in December 1818 by the last Missouri Territorial Legislature from portions of Cape Girardeau and Lawrence counties. Wayne County thus actually predates statehood. In March 1819, Congress established the Territory of Arkansas, and most of Lawrence County became Lawrence County, Arkansas Territory. The small strip that had been excluded was added to Wayne County by the Missouri State Constitution of 1820. The Osage Strip on the Kansas border was added in 1825. Between 1825 and 1831, Wayne County was actually larger than the states of Massachusetts, Connecticut, Rhode Island, and Delaware combined. All or part of 32 present Missouri counties once belonged to Wayne County. Despite its size, the Census of 1820 revealed that Wayne County had a total population of just 1,239 white inhabitants and 204 African American slaves.

When Wayne County was formed in 1818, the territorial legislature appointed five commissioners to govern it. They chose a small settlement called Cedar Cabin on the St. Francis River to be the county seat. Renamed Greenville, it had grown to about 1,000 by the turn of the 20th century. By 1940, however, the population had declined to 572. In 1941, the remaining inhabitants were forced to relocate because of the construction of Lake Wappapello. This new town's population had fallen to 270 in 1950, but has now increased to about 563.

The Wayne County Courthouse was destroyed by a fire in 1854. In 1866, the records in new courthouse were stolen, and in 1892 the courthouse again burned down. Thus few county records survive from that time.

Geography

The most populous community in Wayne County is Piedmont with a population of 2,401 people, followed by Greenville with 563 and Williamsville with 386.

Adjacent counties
Madison County (north)
Bollinger County (east)
Stoddard County (southeast)
Butler County (south)
Carter County (southwest)
Reynolds County (west)
Iron County (northwest)

Major highways
 U.S. Route 67
 Route 34
 Route 49

National protected areas
Mark Twain National Forest (part)
Mingo National Wildlife Refuge (part)

Demographics

As of the 2010 Census, there were 13,521 people, 5,717 households, and 3,850 families residing in the county.  The population density was 18 people per square mile (7/km2). There were 8,083 housing units at an average density of 11 per square mile (4/km2).

The racial makeup of the county was 97% White, 0.7% Black or African American, 0.4% Native American, 0.1% Asian, 0% Pacific Islander, 0% from other races, and 1.8% from two or more races. 1.5% of the population were Hispanic or Latino of any race. According to the 2000 Census, the most common first ancestries reported in Wayne County were 32.9% American, 15.0% German, 11.9% English, 11.7% Irish, 3.0% French (excluding Basque), 2.0% Dutch and 2.0% Italian.

There were 5,717 households, out of which 23.2% had children under the age of 18 living with them, 52.7% were husband-wife families. 32.7% were non-families. 27.7% of all households were made up of individuals, and 13% had someone living alone who was 65 years of age or older.  The average household size was 2.34 and the average family size was 2.82.

In the county, the population was spread out, with 23.1% under the age of 19, 5% from 20 to 24, 14.2%% from 25 to 39, 36.4% from 40 to 64, and 21.4% who were 65 years of age or older.  The median age was 45.8 years.

The median income for a household in the county was $33,954, and the median income for a family was $39,419. Males had a median income of $26,048 versus $18,250 for females. The per capita income for the county was $18,378. About 15.8% of families and 23% of the population were below the poverty line, including 31.9% of those under age 18 and 12.7% of those age 65 or over.

Religion
According to the Association of Religion Data Archives County Membership Report (2000), Wayne County is a part of the Bible Belt with evangelical Protestantism being the majority religion. The most predominant denominations among residents in Wayne County who adhere to a religion are Southern Baptists (62.76%), Methodists (10.08%), and Roman Catholics (7.07%).

2020 Census

Politics

Local
The Republican Party dominates politics at the local level in Wayne County and controls all but one county-wide offices.

State
Wayne County is divided among two legislative districts in the Missouri House of Representatives.
District 144 – Currently represented by Chris Dinkins (R)-Lesterville.

District 153 – Currently represented by Darrell Atchison (R)- Williamsville.

All of Wayne County is a part of Missouri's 27th District in the Missouri Senate and is currently represented by Holly Thompson Rehder (R)-Sikeston.

Federal
Wayne County is included in Missouri's 8th Congressional District and is currently represented by Jason T. Smith (R-Salem) in the U.S. House of Representatives. Smith won a special election on Tuesday, June 4, 2013, to finish out the remaining term of U.S. Representative Jo Ann Emerson (R-Cape Girardeau). Emerson announced her resignation a month after being reelected with over 70 percent of the vote in the district. She resigned to become CEO of the National Rural Electric Cooperative.

Political culture

At the presidential level, Wayne County was traditionally a fairly independent county or battleground, though in recent years the county has become strongly Republican. President Donald Trump received a record 85% of the vote in 2020, building on his former record of 81% he set, in 2016. Bill Clinton also carried the county both times in 1992 and 1996, and since that point the county has been solidly Republican to Extremely Republican. Like many rural counties in Missouri and throughout the United States in 2008, voters in Wayne County favored John McCain over Barack Obama, and favored Mitt Romney by a significantly larger margin in 2012.

In 2004, Missourians voted on a constitutional amendment to define marriage as the union between a man and a woman—it overwhelmingly passed Wayne County with 87.75 percent of the vote. The initiative passed the state with 71 percent of support from voters as Missouri became the first state to ban same-sex marriage. In 2006, Missourians voted on a constitutional amendment to fund and legalize embryonic stem cell research in the state—it failed in Wayne County with 55.15 percent voting against the measure. The initiative narrowly passed the state with 51 percent of support from voters as Missouri became one of the first states in the nation to approve embryonic stem cell research. Despite Wayne County's longstanding tradition of supporting socially conservative platforms, voters in the county have a penchant for advancing populist causes like increasing the minimum wage. In 2006, Missourians voted on a proposition (Proposition B) to increase the minimum wage in the state to $6.50 an hour—it passed Wayne County with 77.36 percent of the vote. The proposition strongly passed every single county in Missouri with 75.94 percent voting in favor as the minimum wage was increased to $6.50 an hour in the state. During the same election, voters in five other states also strongly approved increases in the minimum wage.

Missouri presidential preference primary (2008)

In the 2008 presidential primary, voters in Wayne County from both political parties supported candidates who finished in second place in the state at large and nationally.

Former U.S. Senator Hillary Clinton (D-New York) received more votes, a total of 1,458, than any candidate from either party in Wayne County during the 2008 presidential primary. Wayne County was Clinton's second best county in Missouri; her only better result was in Dunklin County.

Education
Of all adults 25 years of age and older in Wayne County, 87% possessed a high school diploma or higher while 30.3% had a bachelor's degree or higher as their highest educational attainment.

Public schools
Clearwater R-I School District - Piedmont
Clearwater Elementary School (PK-04)
Clearwater Middle School (05-08)
Clearwater High School (09-12)
Greenville R-II School District - Greenville
Williamsville Elementary School (PK-06) - Williamsville
Greenville Elementary School (PK-06)
Greenville Jr. High School (07-08)
Greenville High School (09-12)

Private schools
Victory Baptist Academy - Piedmont - (PK-11) - Baptist
New Hope Christian Academy - Silva - (PK-12) - General Baptist

Public libraries
Piedmont Public Library
Greenville Community Library Greenville, Missouri

Communities

Cities
 Greenville (county seat)
 Piedmont
 Williamsville

Village
 Mill Spring

Unincorporated communities

 Brunot
 Bull Run Camp
 Burbank
 Burch
 Cascade
 Clubb
 Coldwater
 Dees Town
 Gaylor
 Gravelton
 Hiram
 Ladero
 Leeper
 Lodi
 Lowndes
 McGee
 Patterson
 Shook
 Silva
 Virginia Settlement
 Wappapello

Ghost towns
 Barlow

See also
National Register of Historic Places listings in Wayne County, Missouri

References

External links
 Digitized 1930 Plat Book of Wayne County  from University of Missouri Division of Special Collections, Archives, and Rare Books

 
1818 establishments in Missouri Territory
Populated places established in 1818